Armstrong is a compact rural community, unincorporated place, and divisional point on the Canadian National Railway transcontinental railway main line in the unorganized portion of Thunder Bay District in Northwestern Ontario, Canada. The Whitesand First Nation's Armstrong Settlement is coterminous to this community. The Armstrong area is a popular tourist destination in the summer for fishing and hunting.

The community is not part of an incorporated municipality, but is administered by a local services board.

It takes about three hours to get to Armstrong by car from Thunder Bay.

According to the Canada 2016 Census, the community had a population of 193, down from 220 in 2011, a decrease of 12.3%. There are 186 dwellings of which 84 are occupied by usual residents.

Later that year the base was sold to private owners and turned into a popular gathering area for the town that included a restaurant and bar, hotel, multiple apartments, garages, and a curling rink. The area, known as D&L, was closed and abandoned in 1993 and remains that way today.

The town of Armstrong currently has a public school, two restaurants, a Canada Post post office, a clinic, a Mini Mart gas station and motel, and the Armstrong General store (formally J&J General store 1961–2015).

The VIA Rail Canadian train travels through and stops on request in Armstrong.

References

Communities in Thunder Bay District
Designated places in Ontario
Anishinaabe communities in Canada
Local services boards in Ontario